Abd El-Karim Sakr (born 8 November 1918 – 5 March 1994) was an Egyptian football forward who played for Egypt & Farouk (Zamalek SC now).

Career
Abd El Karim scored hattrick in his first match against Zamalek to be the second player to score hattrick in the history of the Cairo Derby, the match ended 5-0 for Al Ahly and El Tetsh scored the two other goals

In 1939 Abd El Karim joined Zamalek from Al Ahly for the then a record amount of 50 Egyptian pound

In 1945 He was offered a £40,000 contract to play for Huddersfield Town but he refused.

International career
He represented Egypt in the 1936 Summer Olympics when he was only 15 years old, scoring Egypt's only goal in the tournament. He also represented his country in the 1948 Summer Olympics.

References

External links
 

1918 births
1994 deaths
Footballers from Cairo
Egyptian footballers
Egypt international footballers
Association football forwards
Zamalek SC players
Footballers at the 1936 Summer Olympics
Footballers at the 1948 Summer Olympics
Olympic footballers of Egypt